Susi Riermeier (born 23 December 1960) is a German former cross-country skier and long-distance runner. She competed in two events at the 1980 Winter Olympics.

Cross-country skiing results
All results are sourced from the International Ski Federation (FIS).

Olympic Games

World Championships

Distance running
Riermeier competed at the 1983 IAAF World Women's Road Race Championships, finishing 61st, before going on to represent West Germany at the IAAF World Cross Country Championships twice in 1985 and 1986. She competed at the marathon distance and won the West German Athletics Championships in that event in 1984.

References

External links
 

1960 births
Living people
Skiers from Munich
German female cross-country skiers
German female cross country runners
German female long-distance runners
German female marathon runners
Olympic cross-country skiers of West Germany
Cross-country skiers at the 1980 Winter Olympics
West German Athletics Championships winners